Battle Hymn is a comic book limited series published by Image Comics in 2004 to 2005, created by B. Clay Moore and illustrated by Jeremy Haun.

It deals with a super-powered group of heroes during the closing days of World War II, and acts as a dissection of comic book and pulp heroes, with the team being modeled after popular archetypes.

The book appeared in Gene Kannenberg's 500 EssentialGraphic Novels (2008).

References

2004 comics debuts
Image Comics titles